This is the list of companies that manufacture cement in Rwanda.

 Cimerwa Cement Limited 
 Kigali Cement Company
 Prime Cement Limited

Production
, Rwanda's cement needs were reported to amount to about 50,000 metric tonnes every month. At that time, the established factories in Rwanda were able to produce enough cement to meet approximately 54 percent of the national cement needs (27 metric tonnes, monthly), leaving 46 percent (23 metric tonnes, every month), to be imported from regional manufactures. Among the regional manufacturers that supply cement to Rwanda are (a) Hima Cement Limited of Uganda (b) Dangote Industries Tanzania (c) Lake Cement Tanzania and (d) Tanga Cement of Tanzania.

See also
List of cement manufacturers in Uganda
List of companies and cities in Africa that manufacture cement

References

External links
 Rwanda: Cement industry news from Global Cement

Rwanda
Cement manufacturers

Manufacturing in Rwanda